Boulevard United Reformed Church was built as Hyson Green Congregational Church on Gregory Boulevard in Hyson Green, Nottingham in 1900.

History

The congregation was formed in 1824 by Castle Gate Congregational Centre. The first church was opened on 8 August 1824. The current building replaced it when the Boulevard Congregational church merged with the Noel-Street Congregational Church.

The building was erected to designs by the architect Harry Gill in 1900. It was built in Bulwell stone with Derbyshire stone dressings, and had a seating capacity of 600.

It later merged with the United Reformed Church.

Organ

The organ was obtained second hand from Castle Gate Congregational Centre in 1909. It dated from 1865 and was by Forster and Andrews. A specification can be found on the National Pipe Organ Register. This organ was later removed and exported to the Netherlands.

References

Congregational churches in Nottingham
Churches completed in 1900
United Reformed churches in Nottingham